Steve Pizzati is an Australian race driver, driving instructor, television presenter and free-lance motoring journalist.
He was born in Melbourne to Italian parents and did not speak English until he was at school. He attended Cathedral College, East Melbourne and St Kevin's College.

In 2008, he was selected from 4,000 applicants to be one of the presenters of Top Gear Australia on SBS TV. In 2010 he was the only host selected by the Nine Network to continue with the new broadcaster thus making him the only host to have been a part of all four series of the show.

Prior to Top Gear Australia, Pizzati competed in various national categories of Australian motor sport including GT racing. He has also been a professional driving instructor for various manufacturers, mainly Porsche and Audi since 1996.

Pizzati was also a regular host of the Top Gear Live and Top Gear Festival shows having joined Top Gear UK hosts Jeremy Clarkson and Richard Hammond for the Top Gear Live stadium show at Acer Arena in Sydney in 2009 and 2015 as well as joining Jeremy Clarkson, James May and Shane Jacobson for the Top Gear Festival at Sydney Motorsport Park in 2013 and 2014.

Radio 3AW Melbourne currently use Pizzati as its motoring expert and has a regular program called "The Upshift" with Tom Elliott on the Drive program every Monday at 3.30pm.

References

1975 births
Australian television presenters
Living people
Racing drivers from Melbourne
Australian people of Italian descent